Fansler is a German-language habitational surname for someone from Vanselow, a place in Siedenbrünzow, Mecklenburg-Vorpommern. Notable people with the surname include:
 Dean Fansler (born 1885), American academic
 Michael Fansler (1883–1963), Justice of the Indiana Supreme Court 
 Priscilla Hiss (née Fansler, 1903–1984), American teacher
 Stan Fansler (born 1965), American baseball player
 Zach Fansler, American politician

References 

German-language surnames